Hierodula trimacula is a species of praying mantis found in Iraq, Iran, Saudi Arabia, Oman, and Yemen.

See also
African mantis
List of mantis genera and species

References

T
Mantodea of Africa
Insects of the Middle East
Insects of Iran
Fauna of Iraq
Insects described in 1870